The Last Emperor is a 1987 epic biographical drama film about the life of Puyi, the final Emperor of China. It is directed by Bernardo Bertolucci from a screenplay he co-wrote with Mark Peploe, which was adapted from Puyi's 1964 autobiography, and independently produced by Jeremy Thomas.

The film depicts Puyi's life from his ascent to the throne as a small boy to his imprisonment and “political rehabilitation” by the Chinese Communist Party.  It stars John Lone in the eponymous role, with Peter O'Toole, Joan Chen, Ruocheng Ying, Victor Wong, Dennis Dun, Vivian Wu, Lisa Lu, and Ryuichi Sakamoto; who also composed the film score with David Byrne and Cong Su. It was the first Western feature film authorized by the People's Republic of China to film in the Forbidden City in Beijing.

The Last Emperor premiered at the 1987 Tokyo International Film Festival, and was released in the United States by Columbia Pictures on November 18. It earned widespread positive reviews from critics and was also a commercial success. At the 60th Academy Awards, it won nine Oscars, including Best Picture, Best Director, and Best Adapted Screenplay. It also won several other accolades, including three BAFTA Awards, four Golden Globe Awards, nine David di Donatello Awards, and a Grammy Award for its musical score. The film was converted into 3D and shown in the Cannes Classics section at the 2013 Cannes Film Festival.

Plot
By 1950, the 44-year old Puyi, former Emperor of China, has been in custody for five years since his capture by the Red Army during the Soviet invasion of Manchuria. In the recently established People's Republic of China, Puyi arrives as a political prisoner and war criminal at the Fushun Prison. Soon after his arrival, Puyi attempts suicide, but is quickly rescued and told he must stand trial.

42 years earlier, in 1908, a toddler Puyi is summoned to the Forbidden City by the dying Empress Dowager Cixi. After telling him that the previous emperor had died earlier that day, Cixi tells Puyi that he is to be the next emperor. After his coronation, Puyi, frightened by his new surroundings, repeatedly expresses his wish to go home, but is denied. Despite having scores of palace eunuchs and maids to wait on him, his only real friend is his wet nurse, Ar Mo.

As he grows up, his upbringing is confined entirely to the imperial palace and he is prohibited from leaving. One day, he is visited by his younger brother, Pujie, who tells him he is no longer Emperor and that China has become a republic; that same day, Ar Mo is forced to leave. In 1919, the kindly Reginald Johnston is appointed as Puyi's tutor and gives him a Western-style education, and Puyi becomes increasingly desirous to leave the Forbidden City. Johnston, wary of the courtiers' expensive lifestyle, convinces Puyi that the best way of achieving this is through marriage; Puyi subsequently weds Wanrong, with Wenxiu as a secondary consort.

Puyi then sets about reforming the Forbidden City, including expelling the thieving palace eunuchs. However, in 1924, he himself is expelled from the palace and exiled to Tientsin following the Beijing Coup. He leads a decadent life as a playboy and Anglophile, and sides with Japan after the Mukden Incident. During this time, Wenxiu divorces him, but Wanrong remains and eventually succumbs to opium addiction. In 1934, the Japanese crown him "Emperor" of their puppet state of Manchukuo, though his supposed political supremacy is undermined at every turn. Wanrong gives birth to a child, but the baby is murdered at birth by the Japanese and proclaimed stillborn. He remains the nominal ruler of the region until his capture by the Red Army.

Under the Communist re-education program for political prisoners, Puyi is coerced by his interrogators to formally renounce his forced collaboration with the Japanese invaders during the Second Sino-Japanese War. After heated discussions with Jin Yuan, the warden of the Fushun Prison, and watching a film detailing the wartime atrocities committed by the Japanese, Puyi eventually recants and is considered rehabilitated by the government; he is subsequently released in 1959.

Several years later in 1967, Puyi has become a simple gardener who lives a peasant proletarian existence following the rise of Mao Zedong's cult of personality and the Cultural Revolution. On his way home from work, he happens upon a Red Guard parade, celebrating the rejection of landlordism by the communists. He sees Jin Yuan, now one of the political prisoners punished as an anti-revolutionary in the parade, forced to wear a dunce cap and a sandwich board bearing punitive slogans.

Puyi later visits the Forbidden City where he meets an assertive young boy wearing the red scarf of the Pioneer Movement. The boy orders Puyi to step away from the throne, but Puyi proves that he was indeed the Son of Heaven before approaching the throne. Behind it, Puyi finds a 60-year-old pet cricket that he was given by palace official Chen Baochen on his coronation day and gives it to the child. Amazed by the gift, the boy turns to talk to Puyi, but finds that he has disappeared.

In 1987, a tour guide leads a group through the palace. Stopping in front of the throne, the guide sums up Puyi's life in a few, brief sentences, before concluding that he died in 1967.

Cast

Other cast members include Chen Kaige as the Captain of the Imperial Guard, Hideo Takamatsu as General Takashi Hishikari, Hajime Tachibana as the General's translator, Zhang Liangbin as the eunuch Big Foot, Huang Wenjie as the eunuch Hunchback, Chen Shu as Zhang Jinghui, Cheng Shuyan as Hiro Saga, Li Fusheng as Xie Jieshi, and Constantine Gregory as the Emperor's oculist.

Production

Development
Bernardo Bertolucci proposed the film to the Chinese government as one of two possible projects – the other was an adaptation of La Condition humaine (Man's Fate) by André Malraux. The Chinese preferred The Last Emperor. Producer Jeremy Thomas managed to raise the $25 million budget for his ambitious independent production single-handedly. At one stage, he scoured the phone book for potential financiers. Bertolucci was given complete freedom by the authorities to shoot in The Forbidden City, which had never before been opened up for use in a Western film. For the first ninety minutes of the film, Bertolucci and Storaro made full use of its visual splendour.

Filming
19,000 extras were needed over the course of the film. The People's Liberation Army (PLA) was drafted in to accommodate.

In a 2010 interview with Bilge Ebiri for Vulture.com, Bertolucci recounted the shooting of the Cultural Revolution scene:

Historical accuracy 
British historian Alex von Tunzelmann wrote that the movie considerably downplays and misrepresents the Emperor's cruelty, especially during his youth. As stated by Tunzelmann and Behr (author of the 1987 book The Last Emperor), Puyi engaged in sadistic abuse of palace servants and subordinates during his initial reign well in excess of what Bertolucci's movie portrays, frequently having eunuchs beaten for mild transgressions or no reason at all; in a demonstrative example, the young Emperor once conspired to force a eunuch to eat a cake full of iron filings simply to see the eunuch's reaction, which he was talked out of by his beloved wet nurse with some difficulty. Tunzelmann states that most people worldwide who have heard of Puyi are likely to have an incorrect understanding of this aspect of the Emperor's reign, as the movie is much more popular globally than more accurate biographies. 

The film contains several other historical inaccuracies: in real life, Puyi left the Forbidden City when his mother died; as he himself recounts in his memoirs, he did not have sex with his wives; Puyi actually stopped the Japanese from killing the Empress's lover rather than let him be murdered; although the film mentions the Beijing Coup, it erroneously claims that the president fled the capital instead of being put under house arrest; the testimonies that Puyi gives to his Chinese interrogators were in fact given at the Tokyo Trials.

Jeremy Thomas recalled the approval process for the screenplay with the Chinese government: "It was less difficult than working with the studio system. They made script notes and made references to change some of the names, then the stamp went on and the door opened and we came."

Soundtrack

While not included on the album soundtrack, the following music was played in the film: "Am I Blue?" (1929), "Auld Lang Syne" (uncredited), and "China Boy" (1922) (uncredited). The Northeastern Cradle Song was sung by Ar Mo twice in the film.

Release
Hemdale Film Corporation acquired all North American distribution rights to the film on behalf of producer Thomas, who raised a large sum of the budget himself. Hemdale, in turn, licensed theatrical rights to Columbia Pictures, who were initially reluctant to release it, and only after shooting was completed did the head of Columbia agree to distribute The Last Emperor in North America. 

The Last Emperor opened in 19 theatres in Italy and grossed $265,000 in its first weekend. It expanded to 65 theatres in its second weekend and 93 in its third, increasing its weekend gross to $763,000 and grossing $2 million in its first 16 days. Six days after its Italian opening, it opened in Germany and grossed $473,000 in its first weekend from 50 theatres and $1.1 million in its first 10 days. The film had an unusual run in US theatres. It did not enter the weekend box office top 10 until its twelfth week in which the film reached number 7 after increasing its gross by 168% from the previous week and more than tripling its theatre count (this was the weekend before it was nominated for the Academy Award for Best Picture). Following that week, the film lingered around the top 10 for 8 weeks before peaking at number 4 in its 22nd week (the weekend after winning the Oscar) (increasing its weekend gross by 306% and nearly doubling its theatre count from 460 to 877) and spending 6 more weeks in the weekend box office top 10. Were it not for this late push, The Last Emperor would have joined The English Patient, Amadeus, and The Hurt Locker as the only Best Picture winners to not enter the weekend box office top 5 since these numbers were first recorded in 1982.

The film was converted into 3D and shown in the Cannes Classics section at the 2013 Cannes Film Festival.

Critical response
The film has received critical acclaim. On Rotten Tomatoes, it has an 87% "Certified Fresh" score based on 119 reviews, with an average rating of 8.10/10. The site's consensus states: "While Bernardo Bertolucci's decadent epic never quite identifies the dramatic pulse of its protagonist, stupendous visuals and John Lone's ability to make passivity riveting give The Last Emperor a rarified grandeur." Metacritic reports a 76 out of 100 rating based on 15 critics, indicating "generally favorable reviews".

It probably is unforgivably bourgeois to admire a film because of its locations, but in the case of The Last Emperor the narrative cannot be separated from the awesome presence of the Forbidden City, and from Bertolucci's astonishing use of locations, authentic costumes, and thousands of extras to create the everyday reality of this strange little boy."

Jonathan Rosenbaum compared The Last Emperor favorably to Steven Spielberg's Empire of the Sun: "At best, apart from a few snapshots, Empire of the Sun teaches us something about the inside of one director's brain. The Last Emperor incidentally and secondarily does that too; but it also teaches us something about the lives of a billion people with whom we share this planet—and better yet, makes us want to learn still more about them."

Re-editing in Japan 
In Japan, the Shochiku Fuji Company edited out a thirty-second sequence depicting the Rape of Nanjing before distributing it to Japanese theatres, without Bernardo Bertolucci's consent. Bertolucci was furious at Shochiku Fuji's interference with his film, calling it "revolting". The company quickly restored the scene, blaming "confusion and misunderstanding" for the edit while opining that the Rape sequence was "too sensational" for Japanese audiences.

Home media
Hemdale licensed its video rights to Nelson Entertainment, which released the film on VHS and Laserdisc. The film also received a Laserdisc release in Australia in 1992, through Columbia Tri-Star Video. Years later, Artisan Entertainment acquired the rights to the film and released both the theatrical and extended versions on home video. In February 2008 The Criterion Collection (under license from now-rights-holder Thomas) released a four disc Director-Approved edition, again containing both theatrical and extended versions. Criterion released a Blu-ray version on 6 January 2009.

Accolades

Alternative versions
The film's theatrical release ran 160 minutes. Deemed too long to show in a single three-hour block on television but too short to spread out over two nights, an extended version was created which runs 218 minutes. Cinematographer Vittorio Storaro and director Bernardo Bertolucci have confirmed that this extended version was indeed created as a television miniseries and does not represent a true "director's cut".

Home video 
The Criterion Collection 2008 version of four DVDs adds commentary by Ian Buruma, composer David Byrne, and the Director's interview with Jeremy Isaacs. It includes a booklet featuring an essay by David Thomson, interviews with production designer Ferdinando Scarfiotti and actor Ying Ruocheng, a reminiscence by Bertolucci, and an essay and production-diary extracts from Fabien S. Gerard.

See also

 Big Shot's Funeral, a film with a plot that involves a fictional remake of The Last Emperor
 List of historical drama films set in Asia

References

External links

 
 
 
 
 
 "The Last Emperor, or The Manchurian Candidate"—An essay by David Thomson at the Criterion Collection

1980s biographical drama films
1980s historical films
1987 drama films
1987 films
Best Drama Picture Golden Globe winners
Best Film BAFTA Award winners
Best Foreign Film César Award winners
Best Picture Academy Award winners
Biographical films about royalty
British epic films
Italian epic films
Cultural depictions of Empress Dowager Cixi
Cultural depictions of Puyi
English-language Italian films
Films about the Cultural Revolution
Films directed by Bernardo Bertolucci
Films produced by Jeremy Thomas
Films scored by Ryuichi Sakamoto
Films set in 1987
Films set in 20th-century Qing dynasty
Films set in Beijing
Films set in China
Films set in Italy
Films set in Manchukuo
Films set in palaces
Films set in Shanghai
Films set in the 1900s
Films set in the 1910s
Films set in the 1920s
Films set in the 1930s
Films set in the 1940s
Films set in the 1950s
Films set in the 1960s
Films shot in Beijing
Films shot in China
Films shot in Italy
Films shot in Shanghai
Films that won the Best Costume Design Academy Award
Films that won the Best Original Score Academy Award
Films that won the Best Sound Mixing Academy Award
Films whose art director won the Best Art Direction Academy Award
Films whose cinematographer won the Best Cinematography Academy Award
Films whose director won the Best Directing Academy Award
Films whose director won the Best Director Golden Globe
Films whose editor won the Best Film Editing Academy Award
Films whose writer won the Best Adapted Screenplay Academy Award
1980s Japanese-language films
1980s Mandarin-language films
Second Sino-Japanese War films
British multilingual films
Italian multilingual films
1980s British films
1980s Italian films